Newport Landing is a community in the province of Nova Scotia, Canada, located in the Municipal District of West Hants. This community is also known as Avondale, and has civic signage listed for both names. The historical name was 'Newport Landing'.

Newport Landing is home to the Avon River Heritage Society and Museum and served as a living museum in the 1990s during the construction and launch of The Avon Spirit.

Avondale/Newport Landing is also home to the Avondale Sky Winery.

References

Communities in Hants County, Nova Scotia
General Service Areas in Nova Scotia